Carlene may refer to:
 Carlene (name)
 "Carlene", a song by Phil Vassar